Bluebird Photoplays (Bluebird Photoplays of New York, Inc. and Bluebird Photoplays of New England, Inc.) was an American film production company that filmed at Universal Pictures studios in California and New Jersey, and distributed its films via Universal Pictures during the silent film era. It had a $500,000 studio in New Jersey.

"It was a subsidiary of Universal Pictures and employed Universal stars (and starlets) and used Universal’s facilities but the pictures were marketed independently from Carl Laemmle’s umbrella company."—Anke Brouwers

Mary MacLaren, was one of its stars. Louise Lovely, an actress from Australia, was one of its stars. Bluebird was a prestige brand for Universal and had a core of actors and directors including Lovely who worked for it. Ida May Park directed for Bluebird Photoplays. Elsie Jane Wilson produced and directed for Bluebird Photoplays. Among those who worked for this short-lived subsidiary of Universal are Carmel Myers, Mae Murray, Rudolph Valentino, Tod Browning, Rex Ingram, Robert Z. Leonard and Rupert Julian.

Louis B. Mayer invested in the company. M. H. Hoffman managed the company.

Filmography
 
Jeanne Doré, (1915)
Shoes (1916)
Undine (1916)
Mother o' Mine (1917)
The Flashlight (1917)
A Doll's House (1917)
Flirting with Death (1917)
Hell Morgan's Girl (1917)
A Kentucky Cinderella (1917)
Susan's Gentleman (1917)
 The Mysterious Mrs. M (1917)
The Girl in the Checkered Coat (1917)
Broadway Love (1918)
The Winner Takes All (1918)
My Unmarried Wife (1918)	
The Raggedy Queen (1918)
Wife He Bought (1918)
Beans (1919)	
The Game's Up (1919)

Gallery

See also
 Butterfly Pictures

Footnotes

References

External links
 Bluebird Photoplays - IMDb
  - British Film Institute

 

Silent film studios
Defunct American film studios
Film production companies of the United States